Central Bank independence refers to the degree of autonomy and freedom a central bank has in conducting its monetary policy and managing the financial system. It is a key aspect of modern central banking, and has its roots in the recognition that monetary policy decisions should be based on the best interests of the economy as a whole, rather than being influenced by short-term political considerations.

The concept of central bank independence emerged in the late 20th century, as many countries were struggling with high inflation and a growing recognition that monetary policy needed to be independent from political influence. The idea was that central banks should be free to make monetary policy decisions that were in the best interest of the economy, rather than being swayed by short-term political considerations.

The purpose of central bank independence is to enhance the effectiveness of monetary policy and ensure the stability of the financial system. Independent central banks are better able to carry out their mandates, which include maintaining price stability, ensuring the stability of the financial system, and implementing monetary policy. By being free from political influence, central banks can focus on long-term goals, such as controlling inflation and ensuring stability, rather than responding to short-term political pressures.

Central bank independence can be classified in various ways. One common classification is based on the extent of the central bank's autonomy, which can be either formal or actual. Formal independence refers to the legal provisions that guarantee the central bank's autonomy, such as its mandate, its organizational structure, and the procedures for appointing its leaders. Actual independence refers to the practical independence that the central bank enjoys in practice, taking into account factors such as its political and institutional environment, its relationship with the government, and the level of transparency and accountability in its operations.

Another common classification of central bank independence is based on the extent to which the central bank is free from government control. This can be either formal or actual, and ranges from complete independence to significant government control, with several intermediate levels in between.

References 

Macroeconomics
Economic policy
Banking
Central banks